Zhou Yu (born 23 January 1989) is a Chinese sprint canoeist. She won gold and silver medal in the women's kayak singles (both 200 and 500 m) at the 2010 Asian Games in Guangzhou, China. Zhou is also a member of Hunan Sports Club, there she is coached and trained by Wu Yubiao.

Zhou represented China at the 2012 Summer Olympics in London, where she competed in both the women's kayak singles and doubles. For her first event, the  women's K-2 500 metres, Zhou and her partner Wu Yanan narrowly missed out of the Olympic medal in the A-final by nearly fourteen hundredths of a second (0.14) behind the Polish pair Karolina Naja and Beata Mikołajczyk, posting their time of 1:44.136. Three days later, Zhou barely advanced to the semi-final rounds of the first ever women's K-1 200 metres, after finishing sixth and attaining a qualified time of 42.885 seconds in the heats. Unfortunately, Zhou fell short in her bid for the final by seven hundredths of a second (0.07) behind Slovenia's Špela Ponomarenko, with a time of 42.279 seconds.

References

External links
NBC Olympics Profile

1989 births
Chinese female canoeists
Living people
Olympic canoeists of China
Canoeists at the 2012 Summer Olympics
Canoeists at the 2016 Summer Olympics
Canoeists at the 2020 Summer Olympics
Asian Games medalists in canoeing
Sportspeople from Liaoyang
Canoeists at the 2010 Asian Games
Canoeists at the 2014 Asian Games
Canoeists at the 2018 Asian Games
Asian Games gold medalists for China
Asian Games silver medalists for China
Medalists at the 2010 Asian Games
Medalists at the 2014 Asian Games
Medalists at the 2018 Asian Games